The Gundersen method is a method in the Nordic combined developed by Gunder Gundersen, a Nordic combined athlete from Norway, that was first used in the 1980s. In it, the ski jumping portion comes first, and points in the ski jump determine when individuals start the cross-country skiing portion, which is a pursuit race, so that whoever crosses the finish line first wins the competition. The system is now also used in the modern pentathlon in which the start times of the final event (a cross-country run) are staggered so that the first to cross the finish line is the winner of the entire event.  World Athletics announced on 7 December 2018 that the 2020 World Under-20 Athletics Championship will adopt the Gundersen method for the decathlon and heptathlon for the final event.

Initially put in at the FIS Nordic World Ski Championships 1985 and at the 1988 Winter Olympics, the event point-time differential has been adjusted at every Winter Olympics. The table below is one point difference at the ski jump equaling a specific number of seconds between skiers or teams at the start of the cross country portion of the event. The point-time differential has been unchanged since October 2008.

References

NBC Olympics.com explanation on Gundersen method  - Accessed 21 December 2009.

Nordic combined